Nino Cristofori (31 July 1930 – 14 March 2015) was an Italian politician. He was a member of the Chamber for seven legislatures, from 1968 to 1993. He held the position of minister of labor and social security in the Amato I Cabinet. He also acted as the undersecretary in the Italian governments for seven times.

Biography
Cristofori was born in Ferrara in 1930. He started his career as a journalist when he became the publisher and editor-in-chief of a newspaper entitled Avvenire Padano. Then he served in different confederations in Ferrera.

Cristofori was first elected to the Chamber of Deputies on 19 May 1968 and served there for five terms. He was Giulio Andreotti's aide and his emissary to Emilia-Romagna. He also served as minister of labor and social security in the cabinet led by Prime Minister Giuliano Amato. On that occasion, he resigned as a deputy in compliance with an internal provision of his party that suggested ministers to free themselves from the parliamentary mandate.

He was a member of the National Council of Christian Democracy and, after its dissolution, of the Italian People's Party, from 1996 to 1999. He subsequently participated in the establishment of European Democracy, which merged in 2002 into the Union of Christian and Centre Democrats, of which he became national councilor.

Personal life and death
Cristofori was married to Carla Calessi with whom he had six children. In addition to the political and journalistic activities he was president of the Italian Boxing League. His daughter, Paola, is married to Tiziano Tagliani who was mayor of Ferrara in 2015.

Cristofori died in Ferrara on 14 March 2015 at 84 years old. His requiem mass was said by Archbishop Luigi Negri of Ferrara.

References

External links

20th-century Italian journalists
1930 births
2015 deaths
Christian Democracy (Italy) politicians
Government ministers of Italy
Members of the Senate of the Republic (Italy)
Politicians from Ferrara
Italian People's Party (1994) politicians
Deputies of Legislature V of Italy
Deputies of Legislature VI of Italy
Deputies of Legislature VII of Italy
Deputies of Legislature VIII of Italy
Deputies of Legislature IX of Italy
Italian newspaper publishers (people)